One to Grow On is an educational public service announcement that broadcast during NBC's Saturday morning line-up from 1983 to 1989, when the network ran cartoons. The name is taken from the custom of putting an extra candle on a birthday cake as "one to grow on". One to Grow On focused on ethical and personal safety dilemmas and attempted to teach viewers how to solve them. The public service announcement appeared immediately after the end credits of NBC cartoons, such as ABC did with Schoolhouse Rock! and CBS with In the News.

The segments were hosted by the stars of NBC primetime series, including Michael J. Fox, Michael Gross, and Justine Bateman from Family Ties; Mr. T and Dwight Schultz from The A-Team; Soleil Moon Frye from Punky Brewster; David Hasselhoff from Knight Rider; Kim Fields, Nancy McKeon, Lisa Whelchel, and Charlotte Rae from The Facts of Life; Richard Moll from Night Court; Malcolm-Jamal Warner and Tempestt Bledsoe from The Cosby Show; Perry King and Thom Bray from Riptide; Joel Higgins and Rick Schroder from Silver Spoons; Kadeem Hardison from A Different World; Jackée Harry from 227; Estelle Getty and Betty White from The Golden Girls; and Michael Landon from Highway to Heaven.

Although many of the celebrities featured were from sitcoms or shows that kids were familiar with, René Enríquez from the adult-oriented prime time show Hill Street Blues also hosted a segment specifically on how children should not be watching his TV show since it was broadcast too late, past a typical child's bedtime on a school night. Another special move was when pro athlete Ozzie Smith hosted a segment which revolved around the issue of usage of snuff, where Smith explained in his segment that he is not a user of snuff and it has nothing to do at all with baseball playing ability or the "image of the big leagues", and then-First Lady Nancy Reagan likewise hosted a 1986 segment encouraging kids to "Just Say No" to drugs and alcohol. A few segments featured a young Jaleel White as one of the child actors.

The public service announcements began with an animated sequence that leads into an animated TV on which an actor appears. After the actors introduced themselves (which, until 1986, was followed by a 30-second commercial), live-action sequences followed, in which a child faced an ethical dilemma. One to Grow On then cut back to the actor, who explained to the viewer how to solve the problem. The child then either had to own up to the consequences of the action or make an effort to rectify the situation. The actor ended the segment by saying, "And that's One to Grow On."

One to Grown On received an Emmy Award in 1987. The programming segment was replaced by The More You Know in September 1989.

References

External links 
 

1983 American television series debuts
1989 American television series endings
Public service announcements of the United States
NBC original programming
English-language television shows
1983 neologisms
American advertising slogans
Interstitial television shows